Pecica (/Pečka) is a town in Arad County, Romania. In ancient times it was a Dacian fortress called Ziridava and today it is an important archeological site. Its administrative territory extends into the Arad Plateau. The town administers three villages: Bodrogu Vechi (Óbodrog), Sederhat (Szederhát) and Turnu (Tornya).

Population

According to the census of 2011 the population of the town counts 12,762 inhabitants. The ethnic composition is as follows: 62.2% Romanians, 28% Hungarians, 8.4% Roma, 0.33% Slovaks, 0.36% Serbs and 0.7% are of other or undeclared nationalities.

History
Due to the abundance of archaeological finds of the zone an important historic period known as the Periam-Pecica culture was named after the settlement. The history of the localities Pecica, Bodrogu Vechi, Sederhat and Turnu is closely connected with the events making highly memorable the entire zone of the Arad Plateau.

The first mention in documents of the locality dates back to 1335 when it was known as Petk. Sederhat was registered only in 1913, Turnu in 1333 under the name of Mok, while Bodrogu Vechi in 1422 under the name of Bodruch. It has a complex political history with periods of Ottoman rule, periods of Habsburg monarchy, Kingdom of Hungary and Kingdom of Romania. After the Austro-Hungarian Compromise of 1867, it became part of the Kingdom of Hungary within Austria-Hungary up until the Treaty of Trianon. Since then the town has been part of Romania.

Economy
Although the economy of the town is prevalent agricultural, the secondary and tertiary economic sectors have also developed
recently. Besides agriculture, the industry of petrol and rock-gas is also well represented. The initiation of the frontier
crossing point at Turnu and the trimming of the thermal water springs should be the most important chances for the
economic development of the town.

Tourism
Tourist attractions include the Roman Catholic Church, the Pecica Cultural Center and the "Lunca Mureșului" park.

Notable residents
 Kuno von Klebelsberg (1875–1932), Hungarian politician, minister of interior and minister of culture
 Roman Ciorogariu (1852–1936), Romanian Romanian Orthodox bishop, journalist and educator
 Marius Cihărean (born 1975), Romanian weightlifter
 Mircea Petescu (1943–2018), Romanian footballer and coach

Sister cities
  Woluwe-Saint-Pierre, Belgium
  Battonya, Hungary

See also 
 Ziridava
 Pecica culture

References

External links 

 Official Portal of Pecica - Overview, including history
 Pecica Historical Data at Arad County Council 
 Pecica Tourism and Historical Data at Arad County Council 

Populated places in Arad County
Towns in Romania
Archaeological sites in Romania
Hungary–Romania border crossings
Localities in Crișana